was a  after Tenpyō-shōhō and before Tenpyō-jingo. This period spanned the years from August 757 through January 765.

Change of era
 757 : The new era name was created to mark an event or series of events. The previous era ended and the new one commenced in Tenpyō-shōhō 9, on the 2nd day of the 8th month.

Events of the Tenpyō-hōji era
 757 (Tenpyō-hōji 1): The new era begins on the 2nd day of the 8th month of Tenpyō-shōhō 9.
 760 (Tenpyō-hōji 4): Additional coins were put into circulation – each copper coin bearing the words Mannen Ten-hō, each silver coin bearing the words Teihei Genhō, and each gold coin bearing the words Kaiki Shōhō.
764: Fujiwara no Nakamaro Rebellion
 26 January 765 (Tenpyō-hōji 9, 1st day of the 1st month): In the 6th year of Junnin-tennōs reign (淳仁天皇6年), the emperor was deposed by his adoptive mother; and the succession (senso) was received by former-Empress Kōken. Shortly thereafter, Empress Shōtoku is said to have acceded to the throne (sokui).

Notes

References
 Appert, Georges and Hiroshi Kinoshita. (1888). Ancien japon. Tokyo: Kokubunsha. OCLC 458497085
 Brown, Delmer M. and Ichirō Ishida, eds. (1979).  Gukanshō: The Future and the Past. Berkeley: University of California Press. ;  OCLC 251325323
 Nussbaum, Louis-Frédéric and Käthe Roth. (2005).  Japan encyclopedia. Cambridge: Harvard University Press. ;  OCLC 58053128
 Titsingh, Isaac. (1834). Nihon Odai Ichiran; ou,  Annales des empereurs du Japon.  Paris: Royal Asiatic Society, Oriental Translation Fund of Great Britain and Ireland. OCLC 5850691
 Varley, H. Paul. (1980). A Chronicle of Gods and Sovereigns: Jinnō Shōtōki of Kitabatake Chikafusa. New York: Columbia University Press. ;  OCLC 6042764

External links
 National Diet Library, "The Japanese Calendar" -- historical overview plus illustrative images from library's collection

Japanese eras
8th century in Japan
757 beginnings
765 endings